Love Lab is a 2013 comedy, slice of life Japanese anime series based on the manga by written and illustrated Ruri Miyahara. While delivering papers to the Student Council Room one day, Riko Kurahashi awkwardly walks in on the Student Council President and student exemplar, Natsuo Maki kissing a dakimakura. Riko then finds herself inadvertently recruited by Natsuo to be her aide in the student council, not only keep her secret, but to also help her practice romantic fantasies.

The anime is produced by Dogakobo and directed by Masahiko Ohta with series composition by Takashi Aoshima, character designs by Chiaki Nakajima, art direction by Shunsuke Suzuki and sound direction by Yasunori Ebina. The series premiered on MBS on July 4, 2013 with later airings on TBS, CBC, BS-TBS and AT-X along with online streaming on Niconico. The series was picked up by Crunchyroll for online simulcast streaming in North America and other select parts of the world, which began from the ninth episode. It was later obtained by the Anime Network for streaming. Aniplex released the series in Japan on seven Blu-ray and DVD volumes starting on September 20, 2013. The anime was licensed by Sentai Filmworks for distribution via select digital outlets and a home media release.

The opening theme is "Love Shitai—!" while the ending theme is "Best FriendS", both by Manami Numakura, Chinatsu Akasaki, Inori Minase, Ayane Sakura and Yō Taichi.



Episode list

Home media
Aniplex released the series in Japan on seven Blu-ray and DVD volumes between September 20, 2013 and March 28, 2014. The box artwork of each volume was drawn by Ruri Miyahara. The complete series was released on Blu-ray and DVD volumes by Sentai Filmworks on August 5, 2014.

Notes

References

External links
Official anime website 

Love Lab